The 2011 World Billiards Championship, the top international competition in English billiards, was held between 24 and 31 October 2011 at the Northern Snooker Centre in Leeds, England. The 34 players were divided six groups of four and two of five in first group stage, with the top two in each group advancing into the second group stage. The 16 players in the second group stage were divided into four groups of 4, with the top 2 reaching the knock-out round.

Mike Russell won his 11th World Billiards Championship title after beating David Causier 1500–558 in the final.

Prize fund
 
Winner: £6,000
Runner-up: £2,750
Semi-final: £1,500
Quarter-final: £750
Third in second group stage: £450
Fourth in second group stage: £300
Highest break: £250
Total: £18,000

First group stage 
In the group stages all matches were up to 500 points.

Group A

Group B

Group C

Group D

Group E

Group F

Group G

Group H

Second group stage 
In the group stages all matches were up to 750 points.

Group A

Group B

Group C

Group D

Knock-out stage

References

External links

2011
2011 in cue sports
2011 in English sport
Sports competitions in Leeds
October 2011 sports events in the United Kingdom
Cue sports in the United Kingdom
2010s in Leeds